KLBP-LP (99.1 FM) is a radio station licensed to serve the community of Long Beach, California. The station is owned by Long Beach Community Television and Media Corporation, and airs a community radio format.

The station was assigned the call sign KLBP-LP by the Federal Communications Commission on January 26, 2016. The station changed its call sign to KRNF-LP on April 3, 2017, and back to KLBP-LP on September 13, 2017

References

External links
 Official Website
 
 FCC Public Inspection File for KLBP-LP

LBP-LP
LBP-LP
Radio stations established in 2018
2018 establishments in California
Community radio stations in the United States
LBP-LP